Sheridan County is a county in the U.S. state of Wyoming. As of the 2020 United States Census, the population was 30,921. The county seat is Sheridan. Its northern boundary abuts the Montana state border.

Sheridan County comprises the Sheridan, WY Micropolitan Statistical Area.

History
Sheridan County was created by the legislature of the Wyoming Territory on March 9, 1888. The county was formed from a portion of Johnson County. Sheridan County was named for Philip Sheridan, a general in the American Civil War and controversial Indian fighter.

A portion of Sheridan County was annexed in 1897 to create Big Horn County. Sheridan County boundary lines were also slightly altered in 1911, and again in 1929, after which it has retained its boundary lines to the present time.

Geography

Adjacent counties

Big Horn County, Montana – north
Powder River County, Montana – northeast
Campbell County – east
Johnson County – south
Big Horn County – west

Major highways
  Interstate 90

  U.S. Highway 14
  U.S. Highway 16
  U.S. Highway 87
  Wyoming Highway 330
  Wyoming Highway 331
  Wyoming Highway 332
  Wyoming Highway 334
  Wyoming Highway 335
  Wyoming Highway 336
  Wyoming Highway 337
  Wyoming Highway 338
  Wyoming Highway 339
  Wyoming Highway 341
  Wyoming Highway 342
  Wyoming Highway 343
  Wyoming Highway 345

National protected area
Bighorn National Forest (part)

Demographics

2000 census
As of the 2000 United States Census, of 2000, there were 26,560 people, 11,167 households, and 7,079 families in the county. The population density was 10/sq mi (4/km2). There were 12,577 housing units at an average density of 5/sq mi (2/km2). The racial makeup of the county was 95.88% White, 0.18% Black or African American, 1.27% Native American, 0.38% Asian, 0.12% Pacific Islander, 0.82% from other races, and 1.34% from two or more races. 2.43% of the population were Hispanic or Latino of any race. 24.8% were of German, 12.3% English, 10.3% Irish, 7.1% American, 6.0% Norwegian and 5.1% Polish ancestry.

There were 11,167 households, out of which 28.40% had children under the age of 18 living with them, 52.00% were married couples living together, 8.20% had a female householder with no husband present, and 36.60% were non-families. 30.90% of all households were made up of individuals, and 12.50% had someone living alone who was 65 years of age or older. The average household size was 2.31 and the average family size was 2.90.

The county population contained 24.10% under the age of 18, 8.00% from 18 to 24, 25.30% from 25 to 44, 27.10% from 45 to 64, and 15.50% who were 65 years of age or older. The median age was 41 years. For every 100 females there were 95.90 males. For every 100 females age 18 and over, there were 94.00 males.

The median income for a household in the county was $34,538, and the median income for a family was $42,669. Males had a median income of $31,381 versus $20,354 for females. The per capita income for the county was $19,407. About 8.60% of families and 10.70% of the population were below the poverty line, including 14.40% of those under age 18 and 6.40% of those age 65 or over.

2010 census
As of the 2010 United States Census, there were 29,116 people, 12,360 households, and 7,701 families in the county. The racial makeup of the county was 95.4% white, 1.2% American Indian, 0.7% Asian, 0.4% black or African American, 0.1% Pacific islander, 0.7% from other races, and 1.5% from two or more races. Those of Hispanic or Latino origin made up 3.5% of the population. In terms of ancestry, 31.5% were German, 16.3% were Irish, 11.8% were English, 7.5% were American, 6.2% were Norwegian, and 5.1% were Polish.

Of the 12,360 households, 27.5% had children under the age of 18 living with them, 49.8% were married couples living together, 8.4% had a female householder with no husband present, 37.7% were non-families, and 30.9% of all households were made up of individuals. The average household size was 2.27 and the average family size was 2.84. The median age was 41.9 years.

The median income for a household in the county was $48,141 and the median income for a family was $61,959. Males had a median income of $45,035 versus $30,780 for females. The per capita income for the county was $26,756. About 5.2% of families and 8.5% of the population were below the poverty line, including 8.1% of those under age 18 and 7.2% of those age 65 or over.

Communities

City
 Sheridan (county seat)

Towns
 Clearmont
 Dayton
 Ranchester

Census-designated places
 Arvada
 Big Horn
 Parkman
 Powder Horn
 Story

Unincorporated communities

 Acme
 Banner
 Beckton
 Burgess Junction
 Kleenburn
 Leiter
 Monarch
 Ucross
 Ulm
 Wolf
 Wyarno

Government and infrastructure
The Wyoming Department of Family Services Juvenile Services Division operates the Wyoming Girls' School, located near Sheridan. The facility was operated by the Wyoming Board of Charities and Reform until that agency was dissolved as a result of a state constitutional amendment passed in November 1990.

Sheridan County voters have been reliably Republican for decades. In only one national election since 1948 has the county selected the Democratic Party candidate (as of 2020) which was 1964 when Lyndon Johnson defeated Barry Goldwater by 3.2 percent. In 2020 Donald Trump received 72.1 percent of the vote; the best ever result for a Republican, a record previously held by Mitt Romney who received 71.7 percent in 2012.

See also

 National Register of Historic Places listings in Sheridan County, Wyoming
Wyoming
List of cities and towns in Wyoming
List of counties in Wyoming
Wyoming statistical areas

Notes

References

Further reading
 Georgen, Cynde.  In the Shadow of the Bighorns: A History of Early Sheridan and the Goose Creek Valley of Northern Wyoming.  Sheridan, Wyoming: Sheridan County Historical Society, 2010.  .
 Georgen, Cynde.  Snippets of Sheridan County History:  366 Newsy Little Stories from the First 125 Years of Sheridan County, Wyoming, 1888-2013.  Sheridan, Wyoming:  Sheridan County Historical Society, 2013.  .

External links

 Sheridan County Web Page

 
1888 establishments in Wyoming Territory
Populated places established in 1888